You Don't Love Me may refer to:

 "You Don't Love Me (True)", a song by Louis Cottrell Jr. with Don Albert and Lloyd Glenn
 "You Don't Love Me" (Willie Cobbs song), 1960
 "You Don't Love Me" (The Kooks song), 2006
 "You Don't Love Me" (Spica song), 2014
 "You Don't Love Me", a song by Stephanie McIntosh from Tightrope
 "You Don't Love Me (No, No, No)", a 1994 song by Dawn Penn
 "You Don't Love Me" (Sickotoy song), 2019